Deltuva is a small town in Ukmergė district, Vilnius County, Lithuania. It is located 6 km north-west of Ukmergė, near the road to Kėdainiai. It has about 500 inhabitants.

Its alternate names include Deltuvos, Dziewałtów (Polish), Konstantinovo, and Develtov (Yiddish).

In the 12–13th centuries Deltuva was a center of a tribal duchy, which embraced the modern lands of Deltuva, Ukmergė, Kavarskas, Anykščiai, Kurkliai, Utena, Molėtai, Dubingiai, Giedraičiai, Videniškės, Balninkai and Šešuoliai. The Duchy of Deltuva was first mentioned in 1219 in Lithuania's treaty with Halych-Volhynia. Teutonic Knights mention Land of Deltuva (Dewilto[w]) in description of roads of Lithuania in 1385. In 1444 a Catholic church was built in Deltuva.

In the 15th century Deltuva belonged to Valimantaičiai family, later – to their successors Kęsgailos and from 16th century – to Radziwiłł. Marcjan Aleksander Ogiński acquired the town in 1681. In 1752 the Holy Trinity Church was built.

In the 19th century the Tyszkiewicz family were the owners of Deltuva. In 1867 Deltuva was renamed to "Konstantinovo" after Konstantin Petrovich Von Kaufman, tsarist official and Governor of Vilna. The old name "Deltuva" was returned to the city in 1914.

References
 A. Semaška (2004). Pasižvalgymai po Lietuvą. 586-587 p.

Footnotes

External links
Maps of Deltuva

Towns in Lithuania
Towns in Vilnius County
Vilkomirsky Uyezd
Ukmergė District Municipality